Haiganush R. Bedrosian (born June 14, 1943) was the Chief Justice of the Rhode Island Family Court from 2010 until her retirement on January 8, 2016.

Personal

Judge Bedrosian is the daughter of Armenian immigrants. She grew up in Cranston, Rhode Island and graduated from Pembroke College. Bedrosian then attended Suffolk University Law School in Boston, MA and acquired a juris doctor degree.

A widow, Judge Bedrosian has a stepson and daughter-in-law, two step-grandchildren and two step-great-grandchildren.

Career
In Bedrosian's early career, she served as a law clerk to Rhode Island Supreme Court Justice Thomas J. Paolino. She was in private practice specializing in family law for several years after working as Assistant General Counsel to the Providence & Worcester Railroad Company. In the early 1970s, Bedrosian also worked as a Special Assistant Attorney General in the Criminal Prosecution Unit. Judge Bedrosian was instrumental in creating statewide standards for Guardian ad litem in Family Court cases.

After being nominated by Governor J. Joseph Garrahy and confirmed by the Rhode Island Senate, Bedrosian became the first female judge to serve on the Rhode Island Family Court in 1980.

Upon the retirement of longtime Chief Judge Jeremiah S. Jeremiah, Jr. on June 30, 2010, Bedrosian became the acting Chief as the senior associate judge of the Court. She was later appointed to serve in that position in a permanent capacity by Governor Donald Carcieri, and officially took the bench as Chief Judge after confirmation hearings and a vote from the Rhode Island Senate.

Retirement
Bedrosian retired from the Family Court in January 2016. She was succeeded by Judge Michael Forte. She receives a yearly retirement pension of over $200,000.00.

Professional Associations 
Bedrosian is a member of the Rhode Island Bar Association. She founded the Rhode Island Trial Judges Association and served as its president for several years.

References

External links
"Family Court Chief Chosen", projo.com; accessed February 3, 2022.

American people of Armenian descent
Living people
Politicians from Cranston, Rhode Island
Women chief justices
1943 births
Pembroke College in Brown University alumni